Events in the year 1950 in Mexico.

Incumbents

Federal government
 President: Miguel Alemán Valdés
 Interior Secretary (SEGOB): Adolfo Ruiz Cortines
 Secretary of Foreign Affairs (SRE): Manuel Tello Baurraud/Jaime Torres Bodet
 Communications Secretary (SCT): Agustín García López
 Education Secretary (SEP): Manuel Gual Vidal
 Secretary of Defense (SEDENA): Gilberto R. Limón
 Secretary of Navy: Alberto J. Pawling
 Secretary of Labor and Social Welfare: Manuel Ramírez Vázquez

Supreme Court

 President of the Supreme Court: Salvador Urbina

Governors
 Aguascalientes: Jesús Maria Rodríguez Flores/Alberto del Valle
 Campeche: Manuel López Hernández 
 Chiapas: Francisco J. Grajales
 Chihuahua: /Oscar Soto Maynez
 Coahuila: Raúl López Sánchez
 Colima: Jesús González Lugo
 Durango: Jose Ramon Valdes/Enrique Torres Sánchez
 Guanajuato: José Aguilar y Maya
 Guerrero: Baltazar R. Leyva Mancilla
 Hidalgo: Vicente Aguirre del Castillo
 Jalisco: José de Jesús González Gallo
 State of Mexico: Alfredo del Mazo Vélez
 Michoacán: Daniel T. Rentería/Dámaso Cárdenas del Río
 Morelos: Ernesto Escobar Muñoz
 Nayarit: Gilberto Flores Muñoz
 Nuevo León: Ignacio Morones Prieto
 Oaxaca: Manuel Mayoral Heredia
 Puebla: Carlos I. Betancourt
 Querétaro: Octavio Mondragón Guerra
 San Luis Potosí: Ismael Salas Penieres
 Sinaloa: Pablo Macías Valenzuela/Enrique Pérez Arce
 Sonora: Ignacio Soto
 Tabasco: Francisco Javier Santamaría
 Tamaulipas: Raul Garate
 Tlaxcala: Rafael Avila Bretón	 
 Veracruz: Angel Carvajal Bernal/Marco Antonio Muñoz Turnbull
 Yucatán: José González Beytia
 Zacatecas: Leobardo Reynoso/José Minero Roque

Events

 June 4: The Diocese of Toluca is erected.
 September: The Viaducto Miguel Alemán is opened. 
 October 30: The Autonomous University of Tamaulipas is established

Film

 List of Mexican films of 1950

Sport

 1949–50 Mexican Primera División season
  Algodoneros del Unión Laguna win the Mexican League. 
 July 8: Querétaro F.C. is founded
 December 26: Club Deportivo Zamora is founded

Births
January 7 – Juan Gabriel, singer, songwriter, and actor (d. 2016).
 February 10 — Luis Donaldo Colosio, Mexican politician and economist, assassinated while campaigning for President of Mexico (d. 1994)
 February 14 — Verónika con K, actress, singer and TV hostess 
February 28 — Jorge Rubén Nordhausen González, polítician (Senator, PAN) (d. 2018).
May 15 – Beatriz Yamamoto Cázarez, politician , deputy from Guanajuato (2012-2015), d. February 8, 2021
June 18 – Moisés Dagdug Lützow, radio-station owner (XEVX-am), politician, Deputy from Villahermosa, Tabasco (2006-2009); (d. 2016).
August 21 — Carlos Miguel Aysa González, lawyer and interim Governor of Campeche starting 2019
September 12 — Fernando Toranzo Fernández, Governor of San Luis Potosí 2009–2015.
December 18 – Lizmark, masked wrestler (d. December 16, 2015).
December 22 — Flavino Ríos Alvarado, politician; interim Governor of Veracruz 2016
Date unknown — María Loreto Elba Rojas Bruschetta, lawyer and judge in Puebla; (d. 2018)

Deaths
Virginia Fábregas, film and stage actress

References

 
Mexico